The transport system now known as the London Underground began in 1863 with the Metropolitan Railway, the world's first underground railway. Over the next forty years, the early sub-surface lines reached out from the urban centre of the capital into the surrounding rural margins, leading to the development of new commuter suburbs. At the turn of the nineteenth century, new technology—including electric locomotives and improvements to the tunnelling shield—enabled new companies to construct a series of "tube" lines deeper underground. Initially rivals, the tube railway companies began to co-operate in advertising and through shared branding, eventually consolidating under the single ownership of the Underground Electric Railways Company of London (UERL), with lines stretching across London.

In 1933, the UK Government amalgamated the UERL and the Metropolitan Railway as a single organisation, named the London Passenger Transport Board. The London Underground has since passed through a series of administrations, expanding further by the construction of new extensions and through the acquisition of existing main line routes, culminating in its current form as part of Transport for London, the capital's current transport administration, controlled by the Greater London Authority.

This timeline lists significant dates in the history of the network. Station names shown are current names; many stations have previously had different names.

1820s

1825Using his patented tunnelling shield, Marc Brunel begins construction of the Thames Tunnel under the River Thames between Wapping and Rotherhithe. Progress is slow and will be halted a number of times before the tunnel is completed.

1840s
1843The Thames Tunnel opens as a pedestrian tunnel.
1845Charles Pearson, Solicitor to the City of London, begins promoting the idea of an underground railway to bring passenger and goods services into the centre of the city.

1850s
1854Metropolitan Railway (MR) is incorporated and granted powers to construct an underground railway from Paddington to Farringdon.
1856Eastern Counties Railway (ECR) opens a line from Leyton to Loughton.

1860s

1860Aylesbury and Buckingham Railway (A&BR) is incorporated.
1862Edgware, Highgate and London Railway (EH&LR) is incorporated to build a railway between Finsbury Park and Edgware.
1863MR opens the first underground railway in the world.
1864MR opens the Hammersmith & City Railway, its first extensions to Hammersmith and to Kensington Olympia.
District Railway (DR) is incorporated.
North Western and Charing Cross Railway (NW&CCR) granted powers to construct an underground line from Euston to Charing Cross.
1865MR extends to Moorgate.
East London Railway (ELR) purchases the Thames Tunnel for conversion to a railway tunnel.
ECR extends to Ongar.
1867EH&LR opens between Finsbury Park and Edgware.
1868MR opens the Metropolitan and St John's Wood Railway, a short branch northward from Baker Street to Swiss Cottage, the first section of the company's eventual extensions into Middlesex, Hertfordshire and Buckinghamshire.
DR opens between South Kensington and Westminster. The MR extends to connect to the DR at South Kensington and both companies operate services over the other's tracks.
A&BR opens between Aylesbury and Verney Junction.
1869DR extends from Gloucester Road to West Brompton.
ELR opens between New Cross Gate and Wapping. First use of Thames Tunnel for trains.
London and South Western Railway (L&SWR) opens line from West London Line to Richmond.
NW&CCR plans are abandoned.

1870s

1870Tower Subway opens, briefly, using a cabled-hauled carriage before conversion to pedestrian use. Constructed using a circular tunnelling shield developed by Peter W. Barlow and James Henry Greathead and lined with segmental cast-iron rings, this short tunnel under the River Thames successfully demonstrated new tunnelling techniques that would be used to construct most of the subsequent underground lines in London.
DR extends from Westminster to Blackfriars.
1871DR extends from Blackfriars to Mansion House.
Euston, St Pancras and Charing Cross Railway revives NW&CCR's plans for an underground line from Euston to Charing Cross and changes its name to London Central Railway (LCR).
Brill Tramway opens between the A&BR's station at Quainton Road and Wood Siding.
1872Brill Tramway extends to Brill.
DR extends from Earl's Court to Kensington Olympia.
Great Northern Railway (GNR) extends E&HLR from East Finchley to High Barnet.
1873GNR extends EH&LR from Highgate to Alexandra Palace.
1874DR extends from Earl's Court to Hammersmith.
City of London financiers establish Metropolitan Inner Circle Completion Railway to complete the Inner Circle by linking the DR's terminus at Mansion House with the MR's planned terminus at Aldgate.
LCR plans are abandoned.
1875MR extends to Liverpool Street.
1876MR extends to Aldgate.
ELR extends from Whitechapel to Shoreditch.
1877DR extends from Hammersmith to connect to the L&SWR at Ravenscourt Park. DR and MR commence services over the L&SWR to Richmond.
1879MR extends to Willesden Green.
MR takes over Metropolitan Inner Circle Completion Railway.
DR extends from Turnham Green to Ealing Broadway.

1880s
1880MR extends to Harrow on the Hill.
DR extends from West Brompton to Putney Bridge.
ELR opens a spur to New Cross (South Eastern Railway)
1882MR extends from Aldgate to Tower of London.
1883DR commences a service over Great Western Railway (GWR) via Slough to Windsor & Eton Central.
DR extends from Acton Town to Hounslow Town.
1884City of London and Southwark Subway established to build a railway from the City of London to Elephant & Castle.
DR extends from Osterley & Spring Grove to Hounslow West.
MR and DR connect Mansion House with Tower of London, completing the Inner Circle.
MR and DR extend east to St Mary's (Whitechapel Road) and connect to ELR with services running to New Cross and New Cross Gate.
DR extends to Whitechapel.
1885MR extends to Pinner.
DR withdraws Ealing Broadway to Windsor & Eton Central service.
1886DR closes Hounslow Town spur.
1887MR extends to Rickmansworth.
1889MR extends to Chesham.
DR connects to L&SWR at East Putney and commences services to Wimbledon.

1890s

1890City of London and Southwark Subway changes name to City and South London Railway (C&SLR), and opens between Stockwell and King William Street, the world's first deep-level underground and electric railway.
Central London Railway (CLR) incorporated to build a tube railway from Bank to Shepherd's Bush.
1891MR takes over A&BR between Aylesbury and Verney Junction.
1892MR extends from Chalfont & Latimer to Aylesbury.
Great Northern & City Railway (GN&CR) granted powers to build a tube railway from Finsbury Park to Moorgate.
1893Charing Cross, Euston and Hampstead Railway (CCE&HR) granted powers to build a tube railway from Strand to Hampstead.
Baker Street and Waterloo Railway (BS&WR) granted powers to build a tube railway from Waterloo to Baker Street.
1897Brompton and Piccadilly Circus Railway granted powers to build a tube railway from Piccadilly Circus to South Kensington.
DR obtains powers to construct a tube railway from Gloucester Road to Mansion to run below its sub-surface line.
Anarchists bomb a MR train which explodes at Barbican, injuring 60 and killing one.
Whitaker Wright's London & Globe Finance Corporation purchases BS&WR.
1898City and Brixton Railway granted powers to build a tube railway from King William Street to Brixton.
Waterloo and City Railway opens between Waterloo and Bank.
1899Great Northern and Strand Railway granted powers to build a tube railway from Wood Green to Strand.
MR services commence over the Brill Tramway.

1900s

1900C&SLR closes King William Street and extends north to Moorgate and south to Clapham Common.
CLR opens between Bank and Shepherd's Bush.
Consortium led by Charles Yerkes takes over CCE&HR.
London & Globe Finance Corporation and BS&WR collapse following Whitaker Wright's fraudulent concealment of large losses.
1901C&SLR extends to Angel.
Yerkes consortium takes over DR, Brompton and Piccadilly Circus Railway and Great Northern and Strand Railway and merges the tube routes to form the Great Northern, Piccadilly and Brompton Railway (GNP&BR).
1902Yerkes consortium takes over BS&WR.
Yerkes establishes the Underground Electric Railways Company of London (UERL) as the holding company of the tube lines under his consortium's control.
DR extends from Whitechapel to Bromley-by-Bow and commences a service from there over the London, Tilbury and Southend Railway to Upminster.
Edgware & Hampstead Railway incorporated to build a railway from Golders Green to Edgware.
1903C&SLR takes over City and Brixton Railway and allows its plans to lapse.
DR extends from Ealing Common to South Harrow.
DR reopens Hounslow Town spur.
Watford and Edgware Railway incorporated to build a railway from Edgware to Watford.
CCE&HR takes over Edgware & Hampstead Railway.
Great Eastern Railway opens Fairlop Loop from Ilford to Woodford via Hainult.
1904GN&CR opens between Finsbury Park and Moorgate.
MR opens branch from Harrow-on-the-Hill to Uxbridge.
Whitaker Wright commits suicide by swallowing cyanide after being convicted of fraud.
1905UERL opens Lots Road Power Station to provide electricity for the DR and the UERL's forthcoming tube lines.
MR and DR replace steam trains with electric over majority of routes.
DR withdraws service between East Ham and Upminster.
DR opens branch from Acton Town to South Acton.
DR withdraws service between St Mary's (Whitechapel Road) and New Cross.
Charles Yerkes dies and is replaced as Chairman of the UERL by Edgar Speyer.
1906Sir George Gibb becomes Managing Director of UERL.
Frank Pick, later Managing Director and Vice Chairman of London Transport, begins work at UERL.
MR withdraws services between Hammersmith and Richmond.
BS&WR opens between Elephant & Castle and Baker Street. It becomes known as the Bakerloo tube.
GNP&BR opens between Finsbury Park and Hammersmith. It becomes known as the Piccadilly tube.
MR withdraws service between St Mary's (Whitechapel Road) and New Cross, pending electrification of the ELR.
1907Albert Stanley, later Chairman of London Transport, begins work at UERL.
C&SLR extends to Euston.
CCE&HR opens between Golders Green, Archway and Charing Cross. It becomes known as the Hampstead tube.
Piccadilly tube opens branch from Holborn to Aldwych.
Bakerloo tube extends to Edgware Road.
1908CLR extends to Wood Lane.
DR restarts service between East Ham and Barking.
The underground railway companies begin to use the "Underground" brand for joint marketing.
First version of the Underground roundel comes into use—a solid red disk with a bar carrying station names is based on a device used by the London General Omnibus Company.
1909DR closes Hounslow Town spur again.

1910s

1910District line extends from South Harrow to connect to the MR at Rayners Lane and commences services to Uxbridge.
District line starts excursion services from Upminster to Southend-on-Sea.
Separate managements of the Bakerloo tube, Hampstead tube and Piccadilly tube companies merge into a single company—the London Electric Railway (LER). The lines continue to be identified by individual names.
1911First escalators come into use at Earl's Court.
1912CLR extends to Liverpool Street.
1913UERL purchases the C&SLR and CLR.
MR takes control of the ELR and the GN&CR.
Following electrification of the ELR, MR restarts service between St Mary's (Whitechapel Road) and New Cross. MR starts service from Whitechapel to Shoreditch and Surrey Quays to New Cross Gate.
Bakerloo tube extends to Paddington.
1914Hampstead tube extends to Embankment.
1915Bakerloo tube extends to Willesden Junction.
MR begins publication of Metro-land its annual guide promoting the use of its line for commuting and leisure. The name becomes synonymous with the developing suburbs north-west of the capital served by the railway.
Sir Edgar Speyer resigns as Chairman of the Underground Group following attacks in the press regarding his Germany origins. He is replaced by Lord George Hamilton.
1916Edward Johnston designs the "Underground" typeface that now bears his name and is used by Transport for London for all transport related purposes.
1917Edward Johnston re-designs the Underground's disk and bar roundel, to suit his new typeface, turning the disk into a ring.
1917Bakerloo tube extends to Watford Junction.
1919Sir Albert Stanley replaces Lord George Hamilton as Chairman of the Underground Group.

1920s

1920CLR extends from Wood Lane to Ealing Broadway.
1922Underground Group purchases unbuilt Watford and Edgware Railway to extend the Hampstead tube to Watford.
1923Hampstead tube extends to Hendon Central.
1924Hampstead tube extends to Edgware.
 C&SLR extends from Euston to connect to Hampstead tube at Camden Town.
1925MR extends from Moor Park to Watford.
1926Hampstead tube links Embankment to Kennington and C&SLR extends to Morden, completing the integration of the two lines.
192955 Broadway opens as headquarters of the Underground Group.

1930s

1932 MR extends to Stanmore.
Piccadilly line extends from Finsbury Park to Arnos Grove.
Piccadilly line extends over District line from Hammersmith to South Harrow.
District line services restart between Barking and Upminster.
MR ends publication of Metro-land.
1933Piccadilly line extends from Arnos Grove to Cockfosters.
Piccadilly line extends over District line from Acton Town to Hounslow West and from South Harrow to Uxbridge. District line service withdrawn between Acton Town and Uxbridge.
Underground Group and MR brought under common public control with the formation of the London Passenger Transport Board (LPTB). Lord Ashfield and Frank Pick, formerly chairman and managing director of the Underground Group, become the LPTB's chairman and vice chairman.
LPTB publishes Harry Beck's first design for the Tube Map.
1935Brill Tramway closes.
LPTB announces the New Works Programme, a five-year plan to modernise and extend the Underground network and to take over and electrify a number of main line routes.
1936Metropolitan line closes from Aylesbury to Verney Junction.
1937The combined Hampstead tube and C&SLR routes are officially renamed the Northern line and the CLR is renamed the Central line.
1938Collision of two trains between Embankment and Temple kills six and injures 45 due to an incorrectly wired signal control.
1939Bakerloo line extends from Baker Street to Finchley Road and takes over Metropolitan line services to Stanmore.
Northern line extends from Archway to East Finchley.
LPTB suspends majority of New Works Programme following outbreak of Second World War.
District line ends excursion services to Southend-on-Sea.

1940s

1940Northern line extends over former EH&LR route to High Barnet.
Metropolitan line services withdrawn between Latimer Road and Kensington Olympia following bomb damage at Uxbridge Road.
Londoners use the deep tube platforms as air-raid shelters in the London Blitz. Hits by German bombs during this period kill passengers and shelterers at Charing Cross (7 killed), Bounds Green (19 killed), Balham (68 killed), Tottenham Court Road (1 killed) and Camden Town (1 killed).
Frank Pick retires from LPTB.
1941Northern line extends over former EH&LR route to Mill Hill East.
Uncompleted new Northern line depot at Aldenham converted for the construction of Halifax bombers.
Plessey uses unopened Central line tunnels between Wanstead and Gants Hill as an underground factory.
 A German bomb explodes at King's Cross St Pancras station killing two members of staff.
 A German bomb explodes in the Central line ticket hall at Bank, killing 56 people.
1943 Overcrowding by members of the public entering the air-raid shelter at the unopened station at Bethnal Green causes the death of 173 people by crushing.
1946Central line extends from Liverpool Street to Stratford.
1947Central line extends from Stratford over former ECR and GNR routes to Woodford and Newbury Park and from North Acton over GWR route to Greenford.
Lord Ashfield retires from LPTB.
1948The government nationalises all London Transport operations and the London Transport Executive (LTE) replaces LPTB.
Central line extends over former ECR and GNR routes to Roding Valley and Loughton and over GWR route to West Ruislip.
1949Central line extends over former ECR route to Ongar.
Circle line appears on tube maps as a separate service for the first time.

1950s
1950LTE abandons New Works Programme Northern line extension to Bushey Heath due to introduction of the Metropolitan Green Belt preventing development in the areas to be served.
1953LTE abandons take-over of former EH&LR line between Mill Hill East and Edgware due to diminished expected passenger numbers and lack of funds.
 A rear-end collision between two trains on the Central line between Stratford and Leyton kills 12 passengers.
1955Aldenham depot opens as bus overhaul works.
1956Parliament grants approval for the construction of the Victoria line.
1957Electric tube trains replace steam-hauled shuttles between Epping and Ongar.
1959District line spur between Acton Town and South Acton is closed.

1960s

1960 The last published underground map designed by Harry Beck is released.
 Electric tube trains replace steam-hauled shuttles between Chalfont & Latimer and Chesham.
1961 Metropolitan line services withdrawn between Aylesbury and Amersham.
1963 London Transport Board (LTB) replaces LTE.
1964 District line services withdrawn between Acton Town and Hounslow West.
Northern City line services withdrawn between Drayton Park and Finsbury Park to allow the tunnels to be reused for the Victoria line.
Experimental automatic ticket gates installed at Stamford Brook, Chiswick Park and Ravenscourt Park stations.
World's first automatic trains brought into service on Central line between Hainault and Woodford to test Victoria line operating systems.
1968Victoria line opens between Walthamstow Central and Warren Street.
1969Victoria line extends to Victoria.

1970s
1970 Greater London Council (GLC) takes control of management of London Underground from London Transport Board controlling the Underground through a new London Transport Executive (LTE).
1971Victoria line extends to Brixton.
 London Underground withdraws last operational steam locomotives from service.
1975Moorgate tube crash kills 43 when a southbound Northern line (Highbury Branch) train fails to stop and crashes into the headwall of the tunnel.
 Piccadilly line extends from Hounslow West to Hatton Cross.
1976Northern line (Highbury Branch) transfers to British Rail operation.
During a bombing campaign against the Underground, an Irish Republican Army (IRA) gunman detonates a bomb on a train and kills the driver and injures a bystander while trying to escape.
1977Piccadilly line extends from Hatton Cross to Heathrow Terminals 1, 2, 3.
1979Jubilee line opens between Baker Street and Charing Cross and takes over Bakerloo line service to Stanmore.

1980s

1980London Transport Museum opens in Covent Garden.
1981GLC introduces Fares Fair policy to reduce ticket prices by increasing London Transport subsidies from local rates.
1982 Fares Fair policy ends following legal challenge from Bromley London Borough Council, which does not have any Underground services.
Bakerloo line withdraws services between Stonebridge Park and Watford Junction.
1983 LTE introduces Travelcard and divides network into five fare zones.
1984Bakerloo line restarts services between Stonebridge Park and Harrow & Wealdstone.
Fire at Oxford Circus guts the northbound Victoria line platform and damages adjacent northbound Bakerloo line platform.
London Regional Transport (LRT) replaces LTE, removing control of transport in London from the GLC.
1985LRT establishes its wholly owned subsidiary, London Underground Limited, to manage the Underground.
1986Piccadilly line opens Heathrow loop and Heathrow Terminal 4.
1987Fire at King's Cross kills 31 people when a blaze breaks out in a Piccadilly line escalator.

1990s

1990Hammersmith & City line appears on the Tube map independently of the Metropolitan line for the first time.
1991Travelcard Zone 5 split to create a new Travelcard Zone 6.
1993Construction work on the Jubilee Line Extension begins.
1994Waterloo & City line transfers from British Rail to London Underground ownership.
Piccadilly line's Aldwych branch closes.
Central line's Epping to Ongar section closes.
1995East London line closes for repairs to Thames Tunnel.
1998East London line reopens.
1999Jubilee line extends from Green Park to Stratford. The section from Green Park to Charing Cross closes.

2000s

2000Last service operates with a train guard.
Transport for London (TfL), an executive body of the Greater London Authority, is established to take over responsibility for London's transport from LRT. London Underground Limited moves to direct control by the Department for Transport.
2002Lots Road Power Station closes.
2003TfL takes control of London Underground Limited from the Department for Transport.
Oyster card smart card ticket system begins operation.
Public Private Partnership infrastructure companies Metronet and Tube Lines take over responsibility for maintenance of underground system. Train operations remain the responsibility of TfL.
A Central line train derails at Chancery Lane when a motor falls from the underside of a carriage. Following investigations, modifications are made to all 1992 stock trains.
2005Suicide bombers detonate bombs on three tube trains and one bus, killing 52 and injuring more than 770. Two weeks later four further bombers fail when their bombs do not explode.
2006East London line closes from Shoreditch to Whitechapel.
2007East London line closes completely for conversion into part of London Overground network.
Metronet goes into administration following failures to manage the costs and programmes of its projects. TfL takes over control.
2008Piccadilly line extends to Heathrow Terminal 5.
Wood Lane station opens.
2009Construction begins on Crossrail.
Circle line extends to Hammersmith.

2010s
2010East London line reopens as part of London Overground network.
TfL takes over Tube Lines.
2012London held the 2012 Olympics and Paralympics, with record levels of Tube ridership.
2013London Underground celebrated its 150th anniversary.
2014Payment using Contactless bank cards begins operation.
2016All-night Night Tube services begin operating on sections of some lines on Fridays and Saturdays.
2017Construction begins on the Northern line extension from Kennington to Battersea Power Station.

2020s
2021 Northern line extension from Kennington to Battersea Power Station opens.
2022 TfL Rail is rebranded to Elizabeth line and the central section between Paddington and Abbey Wood station opens completing the Crossrail project after 13 years of construction.

See also

History of the London Underground
List of London Underground stations
List of former and unopened London Underground stations

Notes

References

 

London transport-related lists
Rail transport timelines
History of the London Underground